Lance Allen Brown (born February 2, 1972) is a former professional American football defensive back in the National Football League (NFL). He played five seasons for the Arizona Cardinals (1995–1996), the Pittsburgh Steelers (1998–1999), and the Buffalo Bills (2001).

1972 births
Living people
Terry Parker High School alumni
Players of American football from Jacksonville, Florida
American football defensive backs
Indiana Hoosiers football players
Arizona Cardinals players
Pittsburgh Steelers players
Buffalo Bills players